The Bell from Hell is a 1973 Spanish-French horror film directed by Claudio Guerin Hill.  The film is also known as A Bell from Hell.  Guerin, the director, was killed in an accidental fall from the bell tower set while directing the film, and the project had to be completed by Juan Antonio Bardem.

Cast 
 Renaud Verley - Juan
 Viveca Lindfors - Marta
 Alfredo Mayo - Don Pedro
 Maribel Martín - Esther
 Nuria Gimeno - Teresa
 Christina von Blanc - María (credited as Christine Betzner)

References

External links 

1973 films
1973 horror films
Spanish horror films
French horror films
1970s Spanish-language films
1970s French films